Corymbia peltata, commonly known as yellowjacket or rustyjacket, is a species of small to medium-sized tree that is endemic to Queensland. It has rough, tessellated bark on the trunk and larger branches, smooth yellowish bark above, a crown of mostly juvenile egg-shaped to round leaves, flower buds in groups of seven, white flowers and barrel-shaped, urn-shaped or shortened spherical fruit.

Description
It has rough, tessellated or flaky bark on the trunk and larger branches, smooth yellowish bark above.

Taxonomy and naming
This eucalypt was first formally described in 1867 by George Bentham who gave it the name Eucalyptus peltata and published the description in Flora Australiensis. In 1995 Ken Hill and Lawrie Johnson changed the name to Corymbia peltata. The specific epithet (peltata) is from the Latin word peltatus meaning peltate, referring to the attachment of the petiole to the leaf blade.

Distribution and habitat
Corymbia peltata grows in tropical woodland and forest in northern Queensland, from the Newcastle Range near Georgetown to the Hervey Range near Townsville and the Burra Range near Hughenden.

Conservation status
Yellowjacket is listed as of "least concern" under the Queensland Government Nature Conservation Act 1992.

See also
 List of Corymbia species

References

peltata
Myrtales of Australia
Flora of Queensland